This is a list of seasons completed by the Dayton Flyers men's college basketball team.

Seasons

|-
| 1943–44
| James Carter
|colspan=4 style="text-align:center"| No basketball due to World War II
|-
| 1944–45
| James Carter
|colspan=4 style="text-align:center"| No basketball due to World War II

Notes

Dayton Flyers
 
Dayton Flyers basketball seasons